Jamestown Wildlife Area consist of  in Northern Kansas.  It is located primarily in Republic County, Kansas and partially in Cloud County, Kansas.  Driving directions are  North and  West of Jamestown.  The area is commonly called "Jamestown Lake" by local residents.

The area is popular for both hunting and fishing.  The lake and its surrounding areas are maintained by the Kansas Department of Wildlife and Parks.

History
The Jamestown Wildlife Area is a collection of wetlands and uplands that have been under state management since 1932. The two larger marshes were one of the twelve wetlands sold to provide funding for Emporia State Teachers College.

Historically, the area was considered a "salty”, shallow, marshy area.  In dry seasons salt could be found, and a large amount of wildlife would come to the area in the wet season.  The area marshes attracted Native Americans, early settlers and were important to migrating herds of bison, flocks of waterfowl and other wildlife.

Local residents constructed dams on the lower ends of both large marshes in the early 20th century to provide a more reliable water supply for recreation.

References

External links
 Jamestown Wildlife Area
 Map of Jamestown Lake
 Republic County Maps: Current, Historic, KDOT
 Cloud County Maps: Current, Historic, KDOT

Protected areas of Cloud County, Kansas
Protected areas of Republic County, Kansas
Wetlands of Kansas
Recreational areas in Kansas
Landforms of Cloud County, Kansas